Kelly Fitzpatrick-Gonez (born 1988) is a former science teacher and current member and former president of the Los Angeles Unified School District Board of Education. She was elected as a board member in 2017 and as president in 2020. Prior to her election, she had previously served as an education policy advisor for the Obama administration.

Early life and education 
Gonez was born in 1988 to an immigrant family in Mission Hills. She attended St. Euphrasia Catholic School in Granada Hills for elementary and middle school and graduated from Bishop Alemany High School in 2006. She was the first in her family to attend college, graduating from University of California, Berkeley with an undergraduate degree in political science and history and later Loyola Marymount University with a master’s degree in urban education.

Career

Early career 
Gonez first taught geometry at an LAUSD high school, later becoming a 6th-grade science teacher from Lake View Terrace. In 2014, Gonez was appointed by then-President Barack Obama to serve as an education policy advisor. As an advisor, she secured over $50 million in additional education funding and led the administration to increase education funding and support for special populations. The Obama administration later endorsed Gonez for the board.

LAUSD Board of Education 
On October 18, 2016, Gonez announced that she would be running for the District 6 seat in the Board of Education. She won against Imelda Padilla on May 17, 2017.

In 2020, she was elected by her colleagues to become the president of the Board of Education, becoming the youngest woman president in the history of the board to become one at 32. Her election, along with Nick Melvoin as vice president, signified a shift toward more influence for backers of charter schools, as both members were supported by pro-charter donors. In 2023, the Board voted to make Jackie Goldberg the president, replacing Gonez.

Electoral history

References 

1988 births
21st-century American politicians
California Democrats
School board members in California
Living people
Loyola Marymount University alumni
University of California, Berkeley alumni
Obama administration personnel